The New York State Right to Life Party was a minor anti-abortion American political party that was active only in the state of New York and was founded to oppose the legalization of abortion in New York State in 1970.

History

In 1970 the Right to Life Party was formed in New York following the decriminalization of abortion in New York. The party attempted to run a gubernatorial ticket made up of Jane Gilroy and Marcia Pilsner and obtained 14,062 signatures, 2,000 more than the 12,000 needed to receive ballot access. However, Secretary of State John P. Lomenzo rejected the petition and the decision was upheld by the state supreme court.

The party first made the state ballot in the 1978 gubernatorial election, where its candidate Mary Jane Tobin won 130,000 votes. Its share of the vote subsequently declined, although it maintained official ballot status until 2002, when it fell short of the 50,000 votes required to remain on the ballot. In 2006, the party endorsed Reverend Jennifer Liese for Governor. Liese's signatures were disputed by a Republican staffer, Rachel L. Bledi. As of November 2006 there were 40,278 members statewide. The party did not endorse a gubernatorial candidate in 2010, though it has been able to get two state supreme court nominees onto the ballot via the petition process.

In 1980 Ronald Reagan attempted to gain the extra ballot access line provided by the party, but was rejected after refusing to agree to the terms that he must choose a pro-life vice presidential candidate, endorse Al D'Amato against Jacob Javits in the Republican Senate primary, and to only endorse Republicans who supported an anti-abortion constitutional amendment. The party ran Ellen McCormack, who had run in the 1976 Democratic Party presidential primaries, in the 1980 presidential election and received 32,327 votes nationally and 24,159 in New York; Reagan won the state against Carter by 165,459 without the extra ballot line. In 1984 the party refused to run or endorse any candidate for president by a vote of 27,000 to 22,000. The leadership of the party criticized and stated that Reagan was not pro-life enough due to his stance on abortion as governor of California and for having George H. W. Bush as his running mate. In 1992 despite having refused to give Reagan its ballot line due to George H. W. Bush being his vice president, the chairwoman of the party stated that his vetoes of abortion rights bills made them willing to give him their nomination.

In 1996 the party gave its ballot line to Constitution Party candidate Howard Phillips which was the only time the party has appeared on the New York presidential ballot.

On August 18, 2000 the party voted to give Reform nominee Patrick Buchanan an additional ballot line for the presidential election, over George W. Bush who had given them no response and Howard Phillips, which was accepted on September 23.

Despite losing ballot access in 2002, the party endorsed Mitt Romney in 2012, and Donald Trump in 2016 and 2020.

Electoral performance

Presidential

Gubernatorial

Comptroller

Attorney general

Voter registration

See also
:Category:New York State Right to Life Party politicians
Politics of New York (state)
Elections in New York
Family Health Care Decisions Act

Notes

References

External links
Official website

Anti-abortion organizations in the United States
Regional and state political parties in New York (state)
Single-issue political parties
Social conservative parties
Political parties established in 1970
Political parties in New York (state)
Conservative parties in the United States